Taman Malim Jaya is a residential area in Batu Berendam, Melaka Tengah District, Malacca, Malaysia.

Education
Sekolah Menengah Kebangsaan Malim
Sekolah Kebangsaan Malim

References

Populated places in Malacca